The Baltimore Blast were a longtime member of the Major Indoor Soccer League. From 1978 to 1980, the team played as the Houston Summit, but moved prior to the 1980–81 season. The team won the league's championship in the 1983–84 season. The team folded when the MISL ceased operation in the summer of 1992.

History
The aggressive promotion of the team by radio partner WFBR (then 1300 AM) was instrumental in the Blast's popularity. Art Sinclair and Charley Eckman handled the play-by-play.

The team was owned by Bernie Rodin, who also owned the Rochester Lancers and the New York Arrows. Mike Zolotorow was the long-time Equipment Manager for 20 years.

In 1991, the Blast contested the Trans-Atlantic challenge, a one-off indoor soccer game at the Sheffield Arena in Sheffield, England. They beat English First Division team Sheffield Wednesday to win the trophy. Wednesday had American international John Harkes in their ranks. The game was the one and only occasion that Eric Cantona played for Sheffield Wednesday during his infamous trial.

Year-by-year

Head coach
 Kenny Cooper 1980–1992

Players
 Robert Prentice 1981-1983

Arenas
Baltimore Arena 1980–1992

Defunct indoor soccer clubs in the United States
Major Indoor Soccer League (1978–1992) teams
Soccer clubs in Baltimore
Soccer clubs in Maryland
1980 establishments in Maryland
1992 disestablishments in Maryland